Oy Teboil Ab is an oil company in Finland, engaged in the marketing, sales and distribution of petroleum products and operation of filling and service stations. It is a subsidiary of the Russian company Lukoil.

History 

Teboil was established by Mauritz Skogström in Helsinki in 1934 at the name Trustivapaa Bensiini (meaning: "Trust-free Petrol (Benzene)"), abbr. TB, from which came the current name in 1966. At the same year, Estonian shale oil companies Eesti Kiviõli and New Consolidated Gold Fields became the main shareholders in the company.  Another predecessor of Teboil, Suomen Petrooli, was established by German investors in Vyborg in 1932.  During World War II, the ownership of Trustivapaa Bensiini was transferred to German owners and later the company was held by the Ehrnrooth's family. After the Continuation War, in 1947 according to the Paris Peace Treaty TB became affiliated and it became the property of the Soviet Union state-owned company Soyuznefteexport. In 1966, the company changed its name to Teboil, which came from the pronouncing of its abbreviation TB with addition 'oil'. During these years, the Finnish government enterprise Neste held a legal monopoly in the wholesale of oil products, thus also Teboil actually obtained its petrol and diesel from Neste.

There is some evidence that Teboil kept tank fuel reserves, in the case the Soviets would invade. These were discontinued after the collapse of the Soviet Union.

In 1994 Soyuznefteexport was privatised and reorganised into Nafta-Moskva. In 2005, Nafta-Moskva sold Teboil to Lukoil.  Teboil acquired JET unmanned stations chain in Finland, from the American company ConocoPhillips in 2006 and they were integrated into the Teboil chain as Teboil Express unmanned stations in 2007. The lubricant factory and laboratory functions of Teboil was moved to the subsidiary LLK Finland, founded in 2007. The three subsidiaries, Suomen Petrooli, Suomen Tähtihovit and Suomen Tähtiautomaatit were merged to the parent company in 2008.
March 3, 2022 Teboil asked Finnish newspaper Kaleva not to use the term "war" when reporting on the company and war in Ukraine and replace "war words" with more Russian-friendly terms like conflict. https://www.is.fi/autot/art-2000008667168.html

Service station network 

At the end of year 2012 there were 336 business locations, of which 141 service stations and 195 unmanned refuelling stations. Commercial traffic is served by around 450 refuelling stations, of which about 210 are unmanned diesel points.

The brand Autoasi ("Of Your Car") works in the car maintenance and spare parts services of Teboil Service Centres.

Market shares 

Teboil is the second-largest oil company in Finland. The company's turnover in 2012 was €2,369 million, and its market share of oil product sales in Finland was 26,8 %.

Market shares in 2012
 petrol 17.7%
 diesel 27.1%
 light heating oil 32.8%
 heavy heating oil 48.6%
 liquid gas 17.9%
 lubricants 30.1%

See also

 Energy in Finland

References

External links 
 Teboil homepages 

Oil companies of Finland
Lukoil
Finland–Soviet Union relations